South Africans in France are South African expatriates in France or French people of South African descent.

In 2014, 1,393 South Africans were recorded as living in France.

Notable South Africans in France 
 Breyten Breytenbach, writer and painter (emigrant)
 Bernard Le Roux, South African-born rugby union player
 Madeleine Masson, playwright
 Samantha Schoeffel, tennis player
 Gerhard Vosloo, rugby player

References 

French people of South African descent
Immigration to France
South African diaspora